Béatrice Patrie (born 12 May 1957 in Lorient) is a French former judge and Member of the European Parliament for the South West of France. She is a member of the Socialist Party, part of the Party of European Socialists.

References

1957 births
Living people
Socialist Party (France) MEPs
MEPs for France 1999–2004
MEPs for South-West France 2004–2009
20th-century women MEPs for France
21st-century women MEPs for France